Apuí Airport , commonly called Prainha Airport is the airport serving Apuí, Brazil.

Airlines and destinations

Access

See also
List of airports in Brazil

References

External links

Airports in Amazonas (Brazilian state)